Henry Fok Ying Tung  (10 May 1923 – 28 October 2006) was a Hong Kong businessman. He has ancestral roots in Lianxi Village, Panyu, now part of Guangzhou, Guangdong. Fok was the Vice Chairman of the National Committee of the Chinese People's Political Consultative Conference since March 1993. In 2006, the Forbes Magazine ranked Henry Fok the 7th wealthiest tycoon in Hong Kong and 181st wealthiest tycoon in the world, with an established net worth of $3.7 billion. He died in Beijing on 28 October 2006.

Biography
Fok was born on 10 May 1923 in Hong Kong to an ethnic Tanka family. Fok's father died in a boating accident when he was just seven. He studied at Queen's College, but was not able to finish junior high due to the Japanese invasion in 1937. He worked as a labourer during that time while helping to run the family's small boat business.

Business
After the war, he became a successful businessman. His business interests included restaurants, real estate, casinos and petroleum. Fok reportedly made his first fortune gun-running into the mainland during the Korean War in the early 1950s, circumventing a United Nations arms embargo. Fok vigorously denied weapons trafficking, but admits having violated sanctions by smuggling steel and rubber as well as other items.

He was the President of the Chinese General Chamber of Commerce in Hong Kong, the President of the Hong Kong Football Association, and the President of the Real Estate Developers Association of Hong Kong. He was also the Chairman of Henry Fok Estates Ltd and the Yau Wing Co of Hong Kong.

In the 1980s Fok organized the effort to bail out OOCL from bankruptcy shortly after its founder Tung Chao-yung died.

Political
Before the handover of Hong Kong in 1997, Henry Fok was a member of the Drafting Committee for the Basic Law of Hong Kong Special Administrative Region (SAR), the vice-chairman of the Preliminary Working Committee of Preparatory Committee of the Hong Kong SAR, and the vice-chairman of the Preparatory Committee of Hong Kong SAR. He was also Standing Committee member of 7th National People's Congress.

The press frequently reports that Henry Fok had introduced Tung Chee Hwa to Jiang Zemin as a possible candidate of the first Hong Kong Chief Executive.

Henry Fok helped Tung Chee Hwa out of a near-bankruptcy of his family's Orient Overseas Container Line in the 1980s. Because of this relationship, it was often said while Tung was the Chief Executive of Hong Kong that Fok 'intervened/advised' if times, or rather Beijing, called for it.

Philanthropy
Henry Fok founded the Fok Ying Tung Foundation in 1984, and it is now one of the largest philanthropic organisations in Hong Kong. Fok founded a high-technology business park in Nansha District, Guangzhou. He is said to have visited the site more than 500 times, and through the Foundation, pledged HK$800 million (US$100 million) to the Hong Kong University of Science and Technology in 2005 to support the initiative.

Personal
Among Fok's children, the best-known are:
 Timothy Fok Tsun-ting – Hong Kong Football Association chairman and Legislative Council member.
 Ian Fok Chun-wan – managing director, Yau Wing Co. Ltd.; Director, Fok Ying Tung Foundation Ltd, a former chairman of the Chinese General Chamber of Commerce, whose son was convicted for drug possession in 2005.

Fok had family roots in Panyu District, Guangzhou, Guangdong.

Death
On 28 October 2006, Fok died at the age of 83 at the Peking Union Medical College in Beijing, where he was being treated for cancer. He had been diagnosed with lymphoma in 1984 and the cancer had reappeared in 2004. His body was flown back to Hong Kong for a traditional funeral in accordance with his wishes. Fok was one of the first Hong Konger to have his casket draped in the Chinese national flag since the handover (the others being T. K. Ann and Wong Ker-lee). He was posthumously awarded the Medal of Reform Pioneer.

References

External links
short bios at Forbes
Commentary in The Standard on Henry Fok's life

1923 births
2006 deaths
Businesspeople in the oil industry
Deaths from cancer in the People's Republic of China
Deaths from lymphoma
Hong Kong billionaires
Hong Kong casino industry businesspeople
Hong Kong businesspeople
Members of the National Committee of the Chinese People's Political Consultative Conference
Hong Kong philanthropists
Hong Kong real estate businesspeople
Recipients of the Grand Bauhinia Medal
Delegates to the National People's Congress from Hong Kong
Members of the Preparatory Committee for the Hong Kong Special Administrative Region
Members of the Selection Committee of Hong Kong
Badminton in Hong Kong
Hong Kong Basic Law Drafting Committee members
Hong Kong Affairs Advisors
20th-century philanthropists
Alumni of Queen's College, Hong Kong
Tanka people
Arms trafficking
Smugglers